Paul Daniel Smith (born 17 December 1979) is an English football coach and former player. He is currently head of goalkeeper coaching at League Two club Colchester United.

Education
Smith holds A-levels in PE, Home Economics, Sociology, Advanced Mathematics, Biology and Geography.

Career

Early playing career
Smith was born in Epsom and made an appearance for his hometown club on the final day of the 1997–98 Isthmian League Third Division season. He continued his career at Charlton Athletic, but was released in the summer of 1999, after one year as a professional. After a short period with Walton & Hersham, Smith moved to Carshalton Athletic in late 1999, but moved to Brentford in August 2000 after they spotted Smith guesting for Crawley Town in a pre-season friendly against The Bees. At Brentford, he made 104 appearances.

Southampton
In January 2004, to address financial problems at Brentford, Smith was sold to Southampton for a fee reported to be £250,000, with additional add on fees totalling £250,000. At Southampton, he was initially deputy to Antti Niemi, but, following Niemi's departure, Smith took over as their number one. However, he found himself further down the pecking order with the arrival of Bartosz Białkowski and Kevin Miller.

Nottingham Forest
In search of first team football, Smith signed for League One side Nottingham Forest for around £500,000 in July 2006. He established himself ahead of Rune Pedersen as Forest's first choice goalkeeper for the club's 2006–07 promotion campaign.

In the 2007–08 campaign, Smith helped Forest gain automatic promotion finishing second in the league they were promoted from League One to the Championship. Smith had a good season and helped enormously in goal, making match winning saves to help the Reds gain promotion. He kept 24 clean sheets in 46 games, the record for the league in that season. This achievement was recognised when he received the Puma Golden Glove award.

He also made footballing history in the Football League Cup when he scored after 15 seconds against Leicester City in the second round of the competition on 18 September 2007. Smith became the quickest goalkeeper ever to score in world football, and the quickest ever goalscorer in the League Cup and for Nottingham Forest. The unusual goal came about because the tie had been previously abandoned at half-time due to the collapse of Leicester City's Clive Clarke, while Nottingham Forest were 1–0 up. In a show of sportsmanship, Leicester allowed Forest to take the kick-off and run up uncontested to score the goal, to restore the score-line to what it was at the abandonment of the previous match. It was decided that Smith should be the player to score, to avoid suspicions surrounding betting patterns. Leicester City did come back into the game to beat Forest 3–2. In July 2008, Smith signed a new two-year contract with Forest, keeping him at the City Ground until 2010, and signed another extension in 2009, to keep Smith at the City Ground until 2012.

After falling out of favour with manager Billy Davies, Smith lost his first choice status to Lee Camp, despite having played in all three of their League Cup matches. On 30 July 2010, Smith was placed on the transfer list and told he was free to seek first team football elsewhere. This was two days after a pre-season friendly at the City Ground against French Ligue 1 team Olympique Lyonnais which Forest lost 3–1. Smith was replaced by youngster Karl Darlow in the 75th minute, and Smith's performance was criticised.

In the 2011–12 season, Smith was restricted to one first team game, a Football League Cup tie at home to neighbours Notts County which ended in a 3–3 draw, Forest winning the penalty shoot-out.

Smith's contract expired with Forest at the end of the 2011–12 season and he was released by the club.

Middlesbrough (loan)
On 8 March 2011, Smith joined Middlesbrough on loan until the end of the season; he made his debut that night in a 2–1 win against Derby County. He played in 10 first team games.

Southend United
On 18 August 2012, Smith signed a two-year deal with Southend United.

Colchester United
On 6 July 2017, Smith joined Colchester United as head of academy goalkeeper coaching.

Career statistics

Honours

Nottingham Forest
League One second-place promotion: 2007–08

References

External links

1979 births
Sportspeople from Epsom
Living people
Association football goalkeepers
English footballers
Walton & Hersham F.C. players
Charlton Athletic F.C. players
Carshalton Athletic F.C. players
Brentford F.C. players
Southampton F.C. players
Nottingham Forest F.C. players
Middlesbrough F.C. players
Southend United F.C. players
Colchester United F.C. non-playing staff
English Football League players
Premier League players
People educated at Glyn School
Footballers from Surrey
Epsom & Ewell F.C. players
Isthmian League players